Events in the year 2021 in Montenegro.

Incumbents
 President: Milo Đukanović 
 Prime Minister: Zdravko Krivokapić

Events
Ongoing — COVID-19 pandemic in Montenegro

 14 March –  2021 Montenegrin municipal elections.

5 September - Clashes in the city of Cetinje following inauguration of Serb Orthodox Church leader Joanikije II.

Deaths

January
24 January – Jevrem Brković, writer, poet,  and historian (born 1933).

March
9 March – Rafet Husović, politician (born 1964).
12 March – Miodrag Baletić, basketball coach (born 1948).

References

 
2020s in Montenegro
Years of the 21st century in Montenegro
Montenegro
Montenegro